The Tuskegee Airmen is a 1995 HBO television movie based on the exploits of an actual groundbreaking unit, the first African-American combat pilots in the United States Army Air Corps, that fought in World War II. The film was directed by Robert Markowitz and stars Laurence Fishburne, Cuba Gooding Jr., John Lithgow, and Malcolm-Jamal Warner.

Plot

During World War II Hannibal "Iowa" Lee, Jr. (Laurence Fishburne), traveling by train to Tuskegee, Alabama, is joined by fellow flight cadet candidates Billy "A-Train" Roberts (Cuba Gooding Jr.), Walter Peoples III (Allen Payne), and Lewis Johns (Mekhi Phifer). At the start of their training, they are met by Colonel Noel Rogers (Daniel Hugh Kelly), the commander of the base; Major Sherman Joy (Christopher McDonald), director of training; and Second Lieutenant Glenn (Courtney B. Vance), liaison officer. The cadets are briefed by Rogers and Joy, both with their own views that set the tone for what the cadets would later face in training: Rogers has an optimistic view of the cadets, wanting the cadets to prove the naysayers wrong and letting them know how much of an honor it would be for the cadets to pass the training and earn their wings as aviators. Major Joy, however, reflects the views of most of white America at the time, belittling the cadets and questioning whether they are up to the task. Afterward, Lt. Glenn tells the cadets that he hoped they took note of the differing views of the two different officers. Later that evening, the cadets are chatting among themselves, and begin to introduce themselves and what their college majors were (e.g. "Lewis Johns, English Literature"). It is during this time where Walter Peoples "guarantees" that no one's name would be called above his on graduation day.

While the cadets begin their classes, Major Joy begins his ploy to discredit the cadets. During a classroom session, Joy has them retake the same flight exam they had to take to get into the program. Later, he takes Peoples on a flight after it is revealed that Peoples has a commercial pilot license. Joy takes the training aircraft, a PT-17, through tricky and dangerous moves to try and break People's will, but the tactic doesn't work-which seems to frustrate Joy even more. Afterwards, Major Joy explains to Colonel Rogers why he decided to give the retest and Joy's beliefs that some (if not all) of the cadets may have cheated to get in the program. Rogers informs Joy that no one scored less than a 95 on the retest, and scorns Joy about his tactics.

After a briefing with the cadets, Major Joy sends each cadet up on flights in their PT-17 training aircraft with an instructor pilot. It ends tragically for cadet Johns (Pheifer), as he struggles to get his aircraft out of a stall. The instructor also tries to regain control but it is too late, as the plane crashes into a building, exploding on impact and killing both Johns and his instructor. Afterwards, cadet Leroy Cappy (Malcolm-Jamal Warner) begins to let self-doubt creep in after seeing John's deadly crash and watching others leave the program. Cadets Lee and Peoples give Cappy a stern pep talk, telling him not to quit. The cadets continue their training, flying with their instructor pilots and controlling the planes on their own. Major Joy even lets cadet Lee make several solo flights around the Base. While watching a film on air combat, Lt. Glenn steps in and begins to teach the cadets. Peoples questions Lt. Glenn on why he, not Major Joy, is teaching air combat class. At this point, Lt. Glenn reveals to the cadets (most notably Peoples) that he had joined the Royal Canadian Air Force, where he was credited with three kills, making him the only Army Air Corps officer on the base with "actual" air combat experience.

 Peoples and Lee, flying solo each in the AT-6 Texan training plane, take part in a mock dogfight where Peoples gets an edge on Lee and "shoots him down". Afterwards, Peoples performs some unauthorized aerobatic maneuvers (buzzing the airfield, barrel rolling) to impress Hannibal, but this also catches the attention of Colonel Rogers and Major Joy, and results in him being removed from the training program. Peoples admits to Colonel Rogers and Major Joy that he made a mistake and pleads with them not to put him out of the program, but to no avail. To avoid going home in disgrace, an emotionally distraught Peoples commandeers an AT-6, takes off with it and commits suicide by deliberately crashing it.

Back at the cadets' barracks, tensions and emotions following Peoples' death begin to reach the boiling point. Cadet Roberts has a heated exchange with cadet Lee on Major Joy's tactics, saying that Joy set out to break Peoples and killed him "like putting a carbine to his head". Cadet Cappy - again letting his own self doubts creep back in - sides with Roberts against Lee, saying that he doesn't see any reason to continue on if Major Joy is going to stick with his attempts to break them as well. Cadet Lee fires back, saying that Major Joy's gameplan was to make them quit, and that he wasn't falling for it. He emphatically says that he isn't going to let Major Joy, anyone else at the Base, or "the God damned Commander-In-Chief himself" stop him from his dreams of flying.

Lt. Glenn and cadets Lee, Roberts and Cappy are on a routine training mission when Cappy's plane begins to experience trouble. Cappy and Lee land on a country road where a prison chain gang are out working in a roadside field. As the planes are coming in to land, the prison guards over the gang force the prisoners out of the way to make room for the planes to land. The guards stand with a mixed look of praise and curiosity when the cadets exit the aircraft; their emotions turn to utter shock when Lee and Cappy take their flight masks off, revealing themselves as black aviators.

The cadets go on to successfully "earn their wings" and are commissioned as 2nd Lieutenants in the Army Air Corps. However, they are not deployed to the European theatre due to congressional concerns over their race. Later, First Lady Eleanor Roosevelt arrives for an inspection. She chooses Lee to take her up in an aircraft. With the ensuing positive press coverage, the men are deployed to North Africa, as part of the 99th Pursuit Squadron, though they are relegated to ground attack missions. During the campaign, Lee's flight encounters a group of Messerschmitt Bf 109s. Ignoring Lee's orders, Cappy breaks formation and attacks, downing one of them. Another Bf 109 hits Cappy's fighter aircraft numerous times, causing a fire in the cockpit and fatally wounding him. Cappy is then killed when his damaged fighter plane crashes after catching fire.

A congressional hearing of the House Armed Services Committee is convened to determine whether the Tuskegee Airmen "experiment" should continue. The men are charged with inherent incompetence: A medical study is used to claim that "Negroes are incapable of handling complex machinery." The hearing decides in the Tuskegee Airmen's favor, due to testimony by their commanding officer, Lt. Col. Benjamin O. Davis (Andre Braugher), and the 99th Pursuit Squadron joins three new squadrons out of Tuskegee to form the all-black 332nd Fighter Group, under the now Col. Benjamin O. Davis.

The 332nd is deployed to Ramitelli, Italy to provide escort for Boeing B-17 Flying Fortress heavy bombers, which are experiencing heavy losses. During this deployment, Lee and Billy Roberts (Cuba Gooding Jr.) sink a destroyer. They also rescue a straggling B-17 which is being attacked by two German fighters while returning from a bombing raid, shooting down both of the enemy Bf 109s. When the bomber's pilot and co-pilot travel to Ramitelli to thank them, the B-17 pilot refuses to believe that black pilots saved them. During a subsequent escort assignment, Roberts is shot down. Later, Lee is awarded the Distinguished Flying Cross for sinking the destroyer and promoted to captain. Having by then earned the respect and admiration of the white bomber pilots, the Tuskegee Airmen are specifically requested for escort for a raid on Berlin - a request advanced in a mission briefing by the same pilot who originally refused to believe that the 332nd had helped his plane.

Cast

A full cast and production crew list is too lengthy to include, see: IMDb profile.

Production

Ottumwa, Iowa, native, Captain Robert W. Williams, a wartime pilot in the U.S. Army Air Corps' "332nd Fighter Group", the all African-American combat unit trained at Moton Field in Tuskegee, Alabama, wrote a manuscript years earlier, and worked with screenwriter T. S. Cook to create a screenplay originally intended for a feature film project. The plot combined fact and fiction to create an essentially historically accurate drama. Linking up with Frank Price, owner of Price Productions in 1985 finally gained some traction for the project and when financing was eventually obtained nearly 10 years later, Williams stayed on as co-executive producer and Price as executive producer.
Originally intended as a HBO made-for-TV project, the network invested more into the production, a reputed $8.5 million (the largest investment in a telefilm project to date) striving for historical accuracy. Although most of the lead characters were fictitious composites of real pilots, the inclusion of Eleanor Roosevelt and General Benjamin "B.O." Davis was based on actual events. When First Lady Eleanor Roosevelt visited Tuskegee Army Air Field in 1941, she insisted on flying with C. Alfred "Chief" Anderson, the first African American to earn his pilot's license and the first flight instructor of the Civilian Pilot Training Program (CPTP) organized at the Tuskegee Institute. She had the photograph of her in a training aircraft with a black pilot at the controls widely circulated. Other than some differences in physical appearance and profile, Andre Braugher's portrayal of "B.O." Davis and his role as the commanding officer pointedly was an accurate depiction of the unit's first commander's personality and character.

Location shooting took place at Fort Chaffee, right outside of Fort Smith, Arkansas. The barracks had been used in the filming of Biloxi Blues (1988), another wartime story. The principal photography also utilized locations at Juliette, Georgia, Muskogee, Oklahoma as well as studio work in Los Angeles, California. A collection of period aircraft including North American T-6 Texans and North American P-51 Mustangs were representative of the many types flown by the Tuskegee Airmen. A small number of authentic P-51 fighter aircraft in appropriate "red tail" colors were employed in the aerial sequences.

In addition, a limited number of period  gun-ciné films were also used, as were sequences from the films, Memphis Belle (1990) and Battle of Britain (1969).  The producers also borrowed a technique used in Memphis Belle by using cutout silhouettes of aircraft to make it appear that there were more aircraft parked at the various airfields. One example of period dialogue that was faithful to the times was Hannibal Lee Jr. (another fictitious composite) singing: "Straighten up..." finished by Billy Roberts (fictional character): "...and fly right." (The catchphrase was derived from the 1944 top-40 hit record, "Straighten Up and Fly Right" by The King Cole Trio led by Nat King Cole.)

Reception
Although originally released on cable, the HBO feature was shown on multiple repeats and eventually was released as a limited feature in selected theaters. In 2001, a home video/DVD version was also released in  both formats. The transfer was done in 1.78:1 aspect ratio, which exactly fills a 16x9 display, and is anamorphically enhanced.

Criticism of the movie was generally focused on clichéd dialogue and slow, stagy scenes, but the overall impression by the public was mostly favorable.

Historical accuracy 
Besides the character of Colonel Benjamin O. Davis Jr. (who is actually among the attendees during the wing pinning ceremony scene) played by Andre Braugher, no other actual real-life Tuskegee airmen were portrayed in this film. Other featured Tuskegee Airmen characters are composites of the men with whom Williams served.

At one point, the character Lewis Johns (Mekhi Phifer) recites "Strange Fruit" to the other recruits in their barracks. "Strange Fruit" is a song recorded by Billie Holiday in 1939, inspired by a poem by Abel Meeropol after he witnessed the lynching of Thomas Shipp and Abram Smith.

At the end, the film details the unit's accomplishments: 66 out of the 450 Tuskegee Airmen died in battle, they engaged and defeated Messerschmitt Me 262s, the first operational jet fighters, and they were awarded a total of 850 medals over the course of the war. The credits also note (inaccurately, but a common belief of the time) that the 332nd never lost a single bomber to enemy fighter action. This claim is a source of historical controversy. The statement was repeated for many years, and not challenged because of the esteem of the Tuskegee Airmen. However, Air Force records and eyewitness accounts later showed that at least 25 bombers were lost to enemy fire. This was, however, still an excellent loss to enemy fire ratio; the average for other P-51 fighter groups of the Fifteenth Air Force was 46 bombers lost.

Awards
The Tuskegee Airmen won the 1996 Peabody Award. The made-for-TV movie also won three Emmy Awards for Outstanding Sound Editing for a Miniseries or a Special, Outstanding Editing for a Miniseries or a Special - Single Camera Production and Outstanding Casting for a Miniseries or a Special. The telefilm was also nominated in a variety of other technical categories including sound mixing, visual effects, music and writing. Laurence Fishburne and Andre Braugher were nominated for Outstanding Lead Actor in a Miniseries or a Special and Outstanding Supporting Actor in a Miniseries or a Special respectively.

At the 1996 NAACP Image Awards, The Tuskegee Airmen won the award for Outstanding Television Movie, Mini-Series or Dramatic Special, while Fishburne won as Outstanding Actor in a Television Movie, Mini-Series or Dramatic Special. Braugher and Cuba Gooding Jr. were nominated in the supporting actor category.

Fishburne was also nominated for the 1996 Golden Globe in the Best Television Actor - Miniseries or Movie category, despite the fact many thought he was too old and mature (Fishburne was entering his late thirties), to portray a green and naive character in his early 20s.

See also

 Fly, a 2009 play about the Tuskegee Airmen
 Red Tails, the 2012 George Lucas film on the 332nd Fighter Group
Wilfred DeFour

References
Notes

Citations

Bibliography

 Ambrose, Stephen Edward. The Wild Blue: The Men and Boys who Flew the B-24s over Germany. New York: Simon and Schuster, 2001. .
 Broadnax, Samuel L. Blue Skies, Black Wings: African American Pioneers of Aviation. Westport, Connecticut: Praeger Publishers, 2007. .
 Bucholtz, Chris and Laurier, Jim. 332nd Fighter Group - Tuskegee Airmen. London: Osprey Publishing, 2007. .
 Cotter, Jarrod. "Red Tail Project." Flypast No. 248, March 2002.
 Holway, John B. Red Tail, Black Wings: The Men of America's Black Air Force. Las Cruces, New Mexico: Yuca Tree Press, 1997. . 
 McKissack, Patricia C. and Fredrick L. Red Tail Angels: The Story of the Tuskegee Airmen of World War II. New York: Walker Books for Young Readers, 1996. .
 Thole, Lou. "Segregated Skies." Flypast No, 248, March 2002.
 The Tuskegee Airmen (VHS/DVD). New York: HBO Home Video (Release date: 23 January 2001.)

External links

1995 television films
1995 films
African-American films
Films about the United States Army Air Forces
American films based on actual events
North African campaign films
Films set in Alabama
Films set in Italy
Films set in the 1940s
Films about race and ethnicity
HBO Films films
Peabody Award-winning broadcasts
Tuskegee Airmen
Films directed by Robert Markowitz
Films scored by Lee Holdridge
World War II aviation films
African-American war films
1990s American films